Theresa Riedl (born July 9, 1965) is an American luger. She competed in the women's singles event at the 1984 Winter Olympics.

References

External links
 

1965 births
Living people
American female lugers
Olympic lugers of the United States
Lugers at the 1984 Winter Olympics
People from Saddle Brook, New Jersey
Sportspeople from Bergen County, New Jersey
21st-century American women